Kessleria klimeschi is a moth of the family Yponomeutidae. It is found in Italy and Slovenia.

The length of the forewings is 6.4-7.7 mm for males and 5.5-6.5 mm for females. The forewings are white with light and dark brown scales. The hindwings are light grey. Adults are on wing from the end of June to the beginning of August.

The larvae feed on Saxifraga paniculata and Saxifraga incrustata. Young larvae mine the leaves of their host plant. When older, they live freely within a spinning.

References

Moths described in 1992
Yponomeutidae
Moths of Europe